Qushchi is a city in West Azerbaijan Province, Iran.

Qushchi may also refer to:
 Qushchi, Kaleybar, East Azerbaijan Province
 Qushchi, Sarab, East Azerbaijan Province
 Qushchi Bayram Khvajeh, East Azerbaijan Province
 Qushchi, Qazvin
 Qushchi, Zanjan